Karaganda or Qaraghandy is the capital of Karaganda Region in the Republic of Kazakhstan. It is the fifth most populous city in Kazakhstan, behind Almaty (Alma-Ata), Astana and Shymkent. Population: 497,777 (2020 Estimate);   Karaganda is approximately 230 km south-east of Kazakhstan's capital Astana.

In the 1940s up to 70% of the city's inhabitants were ethnic Germans. Most of the ethnic Germans were Soviet Volga Germans who were collectively deported to Siberia and Kazakhstan on Stalin's order when Hitler invaded Soviet-annexed eastern Poland and the Soviet Union proper in 1941. Until the 1950s, many of these deportees were interned in labor camps, often simply because they were of German descent. The population of Karaganda fell by 14% from 1989 to 1999 following the dissolution of the Soviet Union; it was once Kazakhstan's second-largest city after Almaty. Over 100,000 people have since emigrated to Germany. There is also a concentration of ethnic Poles in the city.

It is Kazakhstan's most polluted city.

Etymology 
The name "Karaganda" is derived from "caragana" bushes (Caragana arborescens, Caragana frutex), which are abundant in the area.

History

Old Town 

Modern-day Karaganda dates back to 1833, when local shepherd  allegedly found coal on the site of the city, prompting a coal mining boom. By the late 19th century, the local mines had attracted workers from nearby villages, Russian merchants, and entrepreneurs from France and England. After this initial boom, the mines were abandoned, but is often still labeled on city maps as the "Old Town", but almost nothing remains on that site.

20th century

Re-settlement 
Coal mining in the area resumed in 1930, and temporary structures were built for miners and their families. The new area for the city was to the south of the initial mines. In 1931, Karaganda was incorporated as a village, and in 1934, was declared a city. Lead by planner Alexander Ivanovich Kuznetsov, masters plans for Karaganda were laid out from 1934 until 1938.

During the late 1930s, the Karlag Prison was built. During the Stalinist purges, peoples from many different nationalities, including Germans, Karachais, Kalmyks, Chechens, Ingush, Greeks, and Crimean Tatars were sent to Karlag.

Robert F. Kennedy (later US Attorney General and US Senator), alongside US Supreme Court Justice William O. Douglas, visited "five Soviet Central Asian Republics": Turkmenistan, Uzbekistan, Tadzhikistan, Kirghizia, and Kazakhstan. While on the six week trip (e.g., Bukhara, 300 to 1 mosque after Soviet rule), his biographers reported that their delegation was not allowed to visit the city of Karaganda which was one of the sites of the most notorious labor camps within the confines of the Soviet Union. The delegation was diverted to Siberia after four denials of visas.<ref> Kennedy, Robert F. (1955, October 10). Lecture on Soviet Central Asia. Washington, DC: Georgetown University. In: Edwin O. Guthman and C. Richard Allen, RFK: His Words in Our Times''' (pp.37-45). New York, New York: William Morrow. </ref>

 EMP incident 

Prompt gamma ray-produced EMP induced a current of 2,500 amps measured by spark gaps in a  stretch of overhead telephone line to Zharyq, blowing all the protective fuses. It fired circuit breakers and set the Karaganda power plant on fire.

 Late 20th century 
Kuznetsov's master plan for the city was intended to accommodate 300,000 inhabitants, which was surpassed by the late 1960s. This prompted planners to devise a new plan with the goal of accommodating 600,000 people. By the 1980s, the city's population surpassed 600,000 people, creating the need for further expansion. In 1983, the Karaganda Circus was constructed, which was criticized for its high cost.

In the early 1990s, Karaganda was briefly considered as a candidate for the capital of the (then) newly independent Republic of Kazakhstan, but its bid was turned down in favour of Astana.

 Archaeological findings 
In July 2019, remains of a young couple buried face to face dated 4,000 years back were unearthed in Karaganda region in central Kazakhstan by a group of archaeologists led by Igor Kukushkin from Saryarka Archaeological Institute in Karaganda. It is assumed that the Bronze Age couple were 16 or 17 years old when they died. Kukushkin supposes that they were from a 'noble family' thanks to the buried gold and jewelry artifacts, ceramic pots, woman's two bracelets on each arm beads, remains of horses and knives found in the grave.

 Geography 
To the northeast flows the Nura river and to the west the Sherubainura, its main tributary. In the southern part of the city lies the Fedorov Reservoir, built in 1941 by filling a coal mine pit with the water of river Sokyr that flows along the southern limit. The Bugyly Nature Reserve is located in the range.Google Earth

 Climate 

Karaganda has a humid continental climate (Köppen climate classification Dfb'') with warm summers and very cold winters. Precipitation is moderately low throughout the year, although slightly heavier from May to July. Snow is frequent, though light, in winter.

Industry 
Karaganda is an industrial city, built to exploit nearby coal mines using the slave work of prisoners of labour camps during Stalin's reign. Flora Leipman, a British citizen, spent several years unlawfully detained in a number of other nearby camps (built for prisoners of war, foreign citizens accused of espionage, and political prisoners), and described her experiences in the book "The Long Journey Home" (published 1987). The labor camp described in One Day in the Life of Ivan Denisovich where the author Aleksandr Solzhenitsyn had served some time was located near Karaganda.  Commercial extraction of coal continues to be an important activity in the region even today.  

Since local water resources are not sufficient for the needs of a major industrial city, the Irtysh–Karaganda Canal was constructed in the 1960s, to supply the Karaganda metropolitan area with water from the Irtysh River more than 400 km away.

Culture

Religion 

The city is the seat of the Roman Catholic Diocese of Karaganda.

Theater 
The Miners Palace of Culture is a major landmark in Karaganda.

Sports 

FC Shakhter Karagandy is a football club based in the city who play at Shakhtyor Stadium. They finished 7th in the Kazakhstan Premier League in 2022. They last won the competition in the 2012 season and also won the Kazakhstan Cup in 2013. One of the biggest accomplishments of the club is a victory against Celtic from Scotland in the Champions League qualifying rounds in 2013. The score was 2–0. Saryarka Karagandy is a very successful ice hockey team who are the current Kazakhstan Pro Hockey League champions and who used to play in the Russian-based Supreme Hockey League (VHL)

Monuments 
On May 28, 2011, a monument to the famous catchphrase "Where-where? In Karaganda!"

On May 31, 2022, on the Day of Remembrance of the Victims of Political Repressions in the Karaganda Ethnopark, a new monument to the victims of the Holodomor was opened. The monument is located near the mosque on the territory of the Ethnopark, created from granite by Zharmukhamed Tlegenuly. The height of the monument on the pedestal is 1.2 m.

Other 
 Qaraghandy Zoo

Education 
 Karaganda Technical University
 Karaganda University
 Karaganda State Medical University

Other 

Karaganda was often used as the punchline in a popular joke in the former Soviet Union. Karaganda is fairly isolated in a vast area of uninhabited steppe, and is thought by many to be "the middle of nowhere". When used in the locative case (Караганде), the final syllable rhymes with the Russian word for "where" (где), as well as with a Russian obscenity used to answer to an unwanted question "Where?". Thus the exchange: "Где?" — "В Караганде!" ("Where is it?" — "In Karaganda!")

Transport 
Sary-Arka Airport is 20 kilometers south-east of the city. The city is also served by trains with all of them stopping at Karaganda railway station.

Notable residents 
 
 

 Nurken Abdirov, Soviet World War II pilot and Hero of the Soviet Union. A statue in Abdirov's honor is in the center of the city.
 Anjelika Akbar, pianist
 Toktar Aubakirov, former cosmonaut (Soyuz TM-13) and member of Kazakhstan parliament
 Boris Avrukh, chess grandmaster
 Konstantin Engel, professional football player
 Inna German, female volleyball player.
Gennady Golovkin, boxer, former WBA, WBC, IBF and IBO Middleweight Champion, holds the greatest knockout ratio in middleweight championship history and silver medalist in the 2004 Summer Olympics
 Katia Ivanova, glamour model, reality TV star, UK Celebrity Big Brother contestant 2009 (born in Karaganda in 1988)
 Akhmad Kadyrov, former President of the Chechen Republic
 Dimitri Kotschnew, professional ice hockey player
 Andrei Krukov, Olympic figure skater (1998 Winter Olympics)
 Juri Litvinov, Olympic figure skater (1998 Winter Olympics) and national champion
 Aslan Maskhadov, third President, Chechen Republic of Ichkeria
 Valery Oisteanu, writer, photographer, and performance artist
 Aleksandr Shustov, gold medal-winning high jumper
 Dmitriy Karpov, bronze medal-winning decathlon and heptathlon athlete (2004 Summer Olympics)
 Aleksei Grigorievich Stakhanov, Director of Number 31 mine (1943-1957) and Hero of the Soviet Union as a folk hero mine worker with 14 times quota production
 Pavel Vorobiev, professional ice hockey player
 Joseph Werth, Bishop of Transfiguration, Novosibirsk, Russia
 Anatoli Zarapin, Russian professional football coach and former player

Sister cities 
  Songpa-gu, South Korea (since 1994)
  Kamianske, Ukraine
  Arak, Iran (since 2008)

See also 

Karlag
Karaganda Region

References 

 

 
Cities and towns in Kazakhstan
Populated places in Karaganda Region
Cities in Central Asia
Populated places established in 1931
1931 establishments in the Soviet Union